Giancarlo Parretti (born 23 October 1941) is an Italian financier.

In 1989, he took over Cannon Film Group Inc. from Menahem Golan and Yoram Globus.  Almost immediately, he made plans to take over the storied French studio Pathé, and changed Cannon's name to Pathé Communications.  However, the French government blocked his bid due to concerns about his background.

Undaunted, Parretti bought Metro-Goldwyn-Mayer in 1990 for $1.2 billion, using money borrowed from a Dutch subsidiary of Crédit Lyonnais and contingent on future profits financing the purchase from mogul Kirk Kerkorian. Parretti then merged the former Cannon with the MGM purchase to create the short-lived MGM-Pathé Communications.

Under Parretti's control, MGM released almost no films (one victim being the James Bond franchise), while Parretti enjoyed a Hollywood mogul lifestyle. He fired most of the accounting staff and appointed his 21-year-old daughter to a senior financial post. He used company money for presents to several girlfriends, including a former runner-up for Miss Universe. His reign at MGM became the basis for the film Get Shorty, which was produced by MGM.

In 1991, his ownership dissolved in a flurry of lawsuits and a default to Crédit Lyonnais, and Parretti faced securities fraud charges in the United States and Europe.

In March 1999, he was found guilty of misuse of corporate funds and fraud and he was sentenced in absentia to four years in prison and fined 1 million francs by a Paris court.

See also 
 List of trading losses

References

Bibliography 
 
 

1941 births
People from Orvieto
Living people
Film studio executives
Perjurers
Italian fraudsters
Italian white-collar criminals
People convicted of fraud
Metro-Goldwyn-Mayer executives
People convicted in absentia
The Cannon Group, Inc. people